San Diego Comic-Con International is a comic book convention and nonprofit multi-genre entertainment event held annually in San Diego, California since 1970. The name, as given on its website, is Comic-Con International: San Diego; but it is commonly known simply as Comic-Con or the San Diego Comic-Con or SDCC.

The convention was founded as the Golden State Comic Book Convention in 1970 by a group of San Diegans that included Shel Dorf, Richard Alf, Ken Krueger, Ron Graf, and Mike Towry; later, it was called the "San Diego Comic Book Convention", Dorf said during an interview that he hoped the first Con would bring in 500 attendees. It is a four-day event (Thursday–Sunday) held during the summer (in July since 2003) at the San Diego Convention Center in San Diego. On the Wednesday evening prior to the official opening, professionals, exhibitors, and pre-registered guests for all four days can attend a pre-event "Preview Night" to give attendees the opportunity to walk the exhibit hall and see what will be available during the convention.

Comic-Con International also produces WonderCon, held in Anaheim, and SAM: Storytelling Across Media, a conference held in 2016 in San Francisco and beginning in 2018 annually at the Comic-Con Museum in San Diego. Since 1974, Comic-Con has bestowed its annual Inkpot Award on guests and persons of interest in the popular arts industries, as well as on members of Comic-Con's board of directors and the Convention committee. It is also the home of the Will Eisner Awards.

Originally showcasing primarily comic books and science fiction/fantasy related film, television, and similar popular arts, the convention has since included a larger range of pop culture and entertainment elements across virtually all genres, including horror, Western animation, anime, comics, manga, toys, collectible card games, video games, webcomics, and fantasy novels. In 2010 and each year subsequently, it filled the San Diego Convention Center to capacity with more than 130,000 attendees. In addition to drawing huge crowds, the event holds several Guinness World Records including the largest annual comic and pop culture festival in the world.

Comic-Con has been canceled twice due to the COVID-19 pandemic. 2020 marked the first time that the event had been canceled since its establishment. It was rescheduled for July 2021, however, this show was canceled soon after it had been announced. Comic-Con returned later that year with a scaled back version of itself in November 2021, marketed as "Comic-Con Special Edition". Comic-Con, as its former pre-pandemic self, returned to San Diego in July 2022 after a two-year hiatus. The next scheduled Comic-Con will begin on July 20, 2023.

History and organization
The convention was founded in 1970 by Shel Dorf, Richard Alf, Ken Krueger, Mike Towry, Ron Graf, Barry Alfonso, Bob Sourk, and Greg Bear. Initial comic book and sci-fi club meetings would be held at Krueger's Alert Books in Ocean Beach, where much of the foundation of the early Cons coalesced. In the mid-1960s, Dorf, a Detroit-born comics fan, had mounted the Detroit Triple-Fan Fairs, one of the first commercial comics-fan conventions. When he moved to San Diego, California, in 1970, he organized a one-day convention (Golden State Comic-Minicon) on March 21, 1970, "as a kind of 'dry run' for the larger convention he hoped to stage." Dorf went on to be associated with the convention as president or manager, variously, for years until becoming estranged from the organization. Alf co-chaired the first convention with Krueger and became chairman in 1971.

Following the initial gathering, Dorf's first three-day San Diego comics convention, the Golden State Comic-Con, drew 300 people and the venue was held in the basement of the U.S. Grant Hotel, having been secured by Graf, from August 1–3, 1970. Other locations in the convention's early years included the El Cortez Hotel, the University of California, San Diego, and Golden Hall, before being moved to the San Diego Convention Center in 1991. Richard Alf, chairman in 1971, has noted an early factor in the Con's growth was an effort "to expand the Comic-Con [organizing] committee base by networking with other fandoms such as the Society for Creative Anachronism and the Mythopoeic Society, among others. (We found a lot of talent and strength through diversity)." In a Rolling Stone article about the origins of Comic-Con, it noted the work of Krueger, who handled early business matters, and worked to get the event to be organized by a non-profit organization. By the late 1970s, the show had grown to such an extent that Bob Schreck recalled visiting with his then-boss Gary Berman of Creation Conventions and reflecting, "While [Berman] kept repeating (attempting to convince himself) 'This show's not any bigger than ours!' I was quietly walking the floor stunned and in awe of just how much bigger it really was. I was blown away." From 1984 to c. 1994, a trade fair called the "San Diego Comic Book Expo" was held in association with the San Diego Comic-Con; David Scroggy was the organizer.

According to Forbes, the convention is the "largest convention of its kind in the world;" Publishers Weekly wrote "Comic-Con International: San Diego is the largest show in North America;" it is also the largest convention held in San Diego. The convention has an estimated annual regional economic impact of more than $140 million. Yet, in 2009, the estimated economic impact was criticized for allegedly negatively impacting seasonal businesses outside of Comic-Con, low individual spending estimates of attendees, that a large number of attendees live in San Diego, and that the impact of the convention was more cultural than financial.

The estimated economic impact of that year's convention was $180 million. In 2014, the estimated impact of that year's convention was $177.8 million. In 2016, the estimated impact of that year's convention was down to $150 million. By 2018, San Diego Comic-Con saw increasing competition from other comic conventions in places such as New York City, and Washington, D.C., which caused it to compete for attendees and companies time and budget; yet San Diego Comic-Con was described by Publishers Weekly as "a must-do".

The convention is organized by a panel of 13 board members, 16 to 20 full-time and part-time workers, and 80 volunteers who assist via committees. Comic-Con International is a non-profit organization, and proceeds of the event go to funding it, as well as SAM: Storytelling Across Media and WonderCon. The convention logo was designed by Richard Bruning and Josh Beatman in 1995. In 2015, working with Lionsgate, a video channel was created to host Comic-Con related content. In 2015, through a limited liability company, Comic-Con International purchased three buildings in Barrio Logan. In 2018 Comic-Con International purchased a  office in San Diego's Little Italy neighborhood.

In 2017, the organization acquired a lease to the Federal Building in Balboa Park, originally built for the California Pacific International Exposition and previously occupied by the San Diego Hall of Champions, with the intention of opening a Comic-Con Museum. By October 2017, the organization began to hire staff for the museum. Nearly a year after acquiring the lease, the museum was not yet open. During the 2018 Comic-Con International, one reason stated for why the museum had not yet opened was the need for additional funds. Organizers are hoping to raise $25 million with a target opening date of late 2020 or 2022.

On April 17, 2020, the 53rd convention was cancelled due to the COVID-19 pandemic in California. It was originally scheduled to occur from July 23 to 26, 2020, to coincide with the 2020 Summer Olympics in Tokyo, Japan, which was postponed to 2021 due to the pandemic. An "SDCC@Home" digital streaming event was held during the same time period as a replacement for the 2020 event. Although plans were made for the convention to possibly return in 2021 (with 2020 badge holders given the option to receive a full refund or to roll over their badge to 2021), it was announced on March 1, 2021, that the convention would be cancelled once again. Despite availability of COVID-19 vaccines, the organizers assessed that it was still premature and unsafe to hold an in-person event at SDCC's full scale on the originally-scheduled dates, and that Comic-Con International was exploring the possibility of holding a smaller in-person spin-off event later in the year. SDCC@Home will again be held, but in a downsized form due to reduced financial resources.

Events

Along with panels, seminars, and workshops with comic book professionals, there are previews of upcoming feature films and portfolio review sessions with top comic book and video game companies. The evenings include events such as awards ceremonies, the annual Masquerade costume contest, and the Comic-Con International Independent Film Festival, which showcases shorts and feature-length movies that do not have distribution or distribution deals.

Traditional events include an eclectic film program, screening rooms devoted to Japanese animation, gaming, programs such as cartoonist Scott Shaw!'s "Oddball Comics" slide show, Quick Draw! hosted by Mark Evanier with Shaw!, Sergio Aragones and a guest cartoonist responding to improvisational prompts and games (a la Whose Line Is It Anyway?) and animation expert Jerry Beck's program featuring TV's "worst cartoons ever", as well as over 350 hours of other programming on all aspects of comic books and pop culture.

Like most comic book conventions, Comic-Con features a large floorspace for exhibitors. These include media companies such as movie studios and TV networks, as well as comic-book dealers and collectibles merchants. And like most comics conventions, Comic-Con includes an autograph area, as well as the Artists' Alley where comics artists can sign autographs and sell or do free sketches. Despite the name, artists' alleys can include writers and even models.

Academics and comic industry professionals annually hold the Comics Arts Conference at Comic-Con, presenting scholarly studies on comics as a medium.

In recent years, the number of television shows that are promoted far outnumber films. During the 2011 convention, at least 80 TV shows were represented, compared to about 35 films. The shows not only promote in the exhibit halls, but also use screenings and panels of various actors, writers, producers, and others from their shows.

Premium cable channels HBO and Showtime have used the con to promote programs like Game of Thrones (HBO), Dexter (Showtime), Shameless (Showtime) and True Blood (HBO).

In 2013, there were 1075 total panels held during the convention, the plurality of which were anime-focused (29%), followed by comic-focused panels (26%). 1036 vendors participated in the convention in 2013.

There are at least 17 separate rooms in the convention center used for panels and screenings, ranging in size from 280 seats to 6,100 seats. The two biggest are Ballroom 20, which seats approximately 4,900; and Hall H, which seats just over 6,100.

The neighboring Hilton Bayfront is also used, with its main ballroom (Indigo) seating up to 2,600. The other neighboring hotel, the Marriott Marquis & Marina, also hosts a lot of Comic-Con activity. Among other things, the hotel serves as the anime headquarters and is where the nighttime films are shown.

Exclusive collectibles
In the 21st century, the convention has drawn toy and collectibles designers who sell "Comic-Con Exclusive" products. Such companies have included Lego, Hasbro, Funko, Gentle Giant LTD, Mattel, NECA, ThinkGeek, Sideshow Collectibles, Entertainment Earth, Bif Bang Pow!, Mezco, Toynami, and Kotobukiya. Most such exclusives are licensed properties of film, comic book and animation characters.

In the media of comic con international 
Comic-Con International has served as the setting for Mark Hamill's Comic Book: The Movie, and for an episode of the HBO television series Entourage, the latter of which, while set at the event, was not filmed there. Comic-Con also served as an excuse for the fictional characters Seth Cohen and Ryan Atwood's trip to Tijuana, Mexico in episode 7 ("The Escape") of the first season of TV series The O.C. The convention also featured prominently as a setting for the Numb3rs episode "Graphic". In season 4 of Beauty and the Geek, an episode was featured where the contestants traveled to Comic-Con 07 and were given a challenge to create their own superheroes. In an episode of Punk'd, Hilary Swank gets Punk'd after an "attack from talking robot". In season 5, episode six, of the Showtime show Weeds, attendees from Comic-Con 2009 are seen in Silas and Doug's medicinal marijuana club.

Comic-Con featured at some length in the 2011 movie Paul which stars Simon Pegg and Nick Frost.

Issue No. 72 of The Invincible Iron Man (January 1975) was set at the July–August 1974 Comic-Con at the El Cortez Hotel and featured cameos by a few of the special guests. The fifth Kelly Green graphic novel The Comic-Con Heist (1987) written by Leonard Starr and drawn by Stan Drake was set at the 1983 con and depicted such regulars as Will Eisner, Milton Caniff, Burne Hogarth and Jack Kirby along with Shel Dorf; it initially only appeared in French until Classic Comics Press issued a collection of all five volumes of the series in English in 2016. Other comics set at the convention include Archie No. 538 (September 2003), Archie Giant Series No. 601 (October 1989) and No. 624 (October 1991), G.I. Joe No. 180 (July 2012), Dazzler No. 30 (January 1984), Lobo Convention Special ([September] 1993) and Fanboys Vs Zombies. 1992-1995 the Con partnered with Dark Horse Comics for an annual San Diego Comic Con Comics giveaway to attendees spotlighting characters published by Dark Horse.

Comic-Con is mentioned in the long-running CBS geek-targeted sitcom The Big Bang Theory in several episodes, and in NBC's Chuck in the episode "Chuck Versus the Sandworm", as an event the characters enjoy attending. On the Futurama episode "Lrrreconcilable Ndndifferences", the main characters attend the 3010 convention (with it being referred to as "Comic-Con Intergalactic" and the iconic eye logo now sporting multiple eyes), where Fry looks for approval for his own comic while Bender attends a panel from Matt Groening (creator of Futurama as well as The Simpsons) on his new show "Futurella" (a twist on the title of the show and a parody of its cancellation by Fox).

In "It's My Party and I'll Bang If I Want To", an episode of the 2011 season of The Real World: San Diego, the cast attends Comic-Con made up as zombies in order to pass out promotional flyers for the House of Blues, where they worked as part of their season work assignment. Filmmaker Morgan Spurlock released a 2011 documentary feature film set at the convention, Comic-Con Episode IV: A Fan's Hope. Writer Robert Salkowitz also used the 2011 Comic-Con as a backdrop for his book Comic-Con and the Business of Pop Culture, an analysis of the comics industry's 21st-century dilemmas and what the future may hold.

Since 2015, Conan O'Brien has recorded a week of live shows from Comic-Con at the nearby Spreckels Theatre.

In 2015, the Food Network series Cake Masters had an episode where Duff Goldman presented a cake at Comic-Con to the cast of Fantastic Four.

Comic-Con Begins Podcast
In 2020, SiriusXM in association with Stitcher started production on COMIC-CON BEGINS: Origin Stories of the San Diego Comic-Con and the Rise of Modern Fandom . The podcast is a six-part mini-series chronicling the birth and evolution of the San Diego Comic-Con, and is told by over 50 of the original contributors. Among the founders there are also interviews with celebrities like Felicia Day, Ho Che Anderson, Jackie Estrada, Scott Aukerman, Trina Robbins, Kevin Smith, Neil Gaiman, and Bruce Campbell. Hosted by Brinke Stevens of Slumber Party Massacre. The podcast was expanded into the book See You at San Diego: An Oral History of Comic-Con, Fandom, and the Triumph of Geek Culture by creator Mathew Klickstein and published by Fantagraphics on September 6, 2022. The book includes forewords by cartoonists Stan Sakai and  Jeff Smith, and an afterword by  Wu-Tang Clan's RZA. The audiobook version was released on the same day by Blackstone Audio.

Locations and dates

Comic-Con Magazine
Comic-Con Magazine, formerly known as Update, is the official magazine of San Diego Comic-Con International, WonderCon, and SAM: Storytelling Across Media, published free by San Diego Comic-Con International in the United States. The seed of the Comic-Con Magazine was a short one-shot issue of The Spirit, based on Comic-Con and sold exclusively in 1976 at the San Diego Comic-Con International. The Comic-Con Magazine debuted as Update in July 2005 and mainly focused on the winners of the Eisner Awards. The last Update issue appeared in July 2008; then it went on hiatus. When it came back, it was as Comic-Con Magazine, which not only covered San Diego Comic-Con International, but also WonderCon and the Alternative Press Expo, more commonly known as APE (which the con owned through 2014). The new Comic-Con Magazine features interviews with Comic-Con attendees and complete coverage of the Comic-Con events. The fourth issue of Comic-Con Magazine was a hybrid with Comic-Con's Souvenir Book with cover art by Alex Ross, in full color and exclusive to Comic-Con attendees.

Exhibitors

A large number of exhibitors from art, comics, games, film, TV, and publishing are at Comic-Con.

There are three types of exhibitors at San Diego Comic Con. Inside the convention center, which requires a badge to visit during the convention, includes artists alley and the main exhibitor hall. Artist Alley is for up and coming artists who are new to the pop culture world by selling their new books, comics, toys, and or services. They range from local companies and businesses in Southern California to international ones, but are mainly private endeavors. Artist Alley is usually located in Hall G of the convention center. Spaces for these exhibitors are highly sought after and are on a lottery and need-based system.

The main exhibit hall, which includes larger well-recognized companies, takes up halls F through A. These companies sell or promote new and upcoming movies, television shows, and video games as well as featuring toys and exclusives with many selling for hundreds or even thousands on the secondary markets outside the convention. Some notable recurring companies include Lego, Hasbro, Funko, Hallmark Cards, Nickelodeon, Cartoon Network, The Walt Disney Company, and Blizzard Entertainment.

Off site
The other type of exhibitors include offsite exhibitors, booths and events which are located outside the convention center. These locations are usually within walking distance of the convention center but have been moving into nearby parks in recent years. Some notable examples include Gaslamp Quarter, San Diego, Petco Park, and Children's Park (San Diego). In recent years, these offsite events have no connection to SDCC. In the past, most sites have not required a Comic-Con badge. In 2017, one example was a virtual reality and immersive set based on the movie Blade Runner 2049. In 2018, these examples included a Taco Bell Demolition Man themed pop-up restaurant in the Gaslamp; and a Shake Shack Bob's Burgers themed pop-up restaurant in Mission Valley. However, there are some official offsite events that require a badge. In 2018, it was estimated that nearly 200,000 people will be in Downtown San Diego due to Comic-Con related exhibits and events.

Overcrowding

Capacity attendance at Comic-Con in 2006 and 2007 has caused crowding issues. Concerns have been raised that the event is possibly too large for the San Diego Convention Center, Comic-Con's home through at least 2022. In 2006, Comic-Con, for the first time, had to close registration for a few hours on Saturday to accommodate crowds. In response, for 2007, Comic-Con introduced a new three-day membership that did not include Saturday. Nevertheless, the 2007 show went on to sell out Saturday, as well as Friday and Sunday for the first time. Additionally, both the four-day and three-day memberships sold out for the first time. For 2008, the three-day memberships were abandoned and the convention decided to sell memberships only in advance, with no on-site registration. In 2008, all memberships were sold out before the convention for the first time. This sellout has given rise to the new phenomenon of Comic-Con memberships being scalped for exorbitant prices on websites such as eBay and Craigslist.

In April 2008, David Glanzer, Comic-Con's director of marketing and public relations, commented on the organization's desire to remain in San Diego:

Heidi McDonald reported on her blog The Beat as of October 7, 2009, Preview Night for the 2010 show had already sold out. Glazner explained the early sell-out:

Mark Evanier on his blog News from ME noted as of November 9, 2009, that all 4-day passes for the 2010 show had already been sold out. On February 23, 2010, The Orange County Register reported that the larger Anaheim Convention Center in Anaheim would be making a bid to become the new home of Comic-Con starting in 2013. On September 30, 2010, Comic Con announced that they had extended their stay up to 2015. The North County Times reported on July 26, 2010, that 4-day passes with access to Preview night for the 2011 Convention had sold out two hours before the 2010 convention closed. Comic-Con International announced that 4-day passes for the 2014 convention (July 24–27) would no longer be available and only single days would be sold. Due to overcrowding, organizers of the event capped attendance; this cap has been in place since 2007.

As of October 2013, a $520 million proposed expansion to the San Diego Convention Center received approval from the California Coastal Commission. The proposed expansion would increase the available space within the convention center and had a target completion date of early 2016. The expansion would add approximately 225,000 square feet of exhibit space, an additional 35%; and a brand-new 80,000 square foot ballroom, 20% larger than Hall H. The plan would also add a second tower to the Hilton Bayfront hotel, adding 500 rooms adjacent to the Convention Center. Due to the proposed expansion of the convention center, Comic Con extended its contract for San Diego to 2016. In 2014, convention center expansion was halted due to a lawsuit. As of July 2015, convention center expansion is effectively frozen, partly because the city no longer has financing lined up for it (any financing plan would involve taxpayer money and would have to be approved by a public vote), and partly because the city lost the rights to the only contiguous parcel of land where expansion could occur. Other cities, including Los Angeles, began to seek to have Comic-Con move out of San Diego; In 2015, Comic-Con entered into negotiations with San Diego. As a result of these negotiations, Comic-Con entered into a contract to stay in San Diego through 2018. In 2017 the commitment to San Diego was extended to 2021.

Accidents and incidents

In 2013, a young woman attempted to jump off the balcony of a local high-rise, but nearby stuntmen prevented it.

In 2014, multiple pedestrians marching in an off-site ZombieWalk were struck by a car forcing its way through an intersection. A 64-year-old woman sustained serious injuries to her arm; two others had minor injuries.

The same year, a teenage cosplayer was initially thought to have been sexually assaulted early Sunday morning, and a suspect was arrested on Sunday at the San Diego Marriott Hotel and Marina. Police later stated that the teenage girl was injured in a fall; the arrested individual was released without any charges.

Trademark
In 2014, San Diego Comic-Con sent a cease and desist order to the organizers Salt Lake Comic Con, asserting that "Comic-Con" and "Comic-Con International" were registered trademarks of the convention, and that use of the term "comic con" in any form was trademark infringement as it implies an unauthorized association with San Diego Comic-Con. A U.S. court ruled in favor of San Diego Comic-Con and awarded $20,000 in damages (albeit not considering the infringement to be willful). Phoenix Comiccon changed its name to Phoenix Comic Fest as a proactive move to avoid possible legal issues in the wake of this ruling. They then filed a motion in an Arizona Federal Court to strike down San Diego Comic Convention's trademark In 2017, the Salt Lake Comic Con changed its name to FanX Salt Lake Comic Convention (or just FanX). On January 16, 2018, Salt Lake Comic Con filed a motion for a new trial.

See also
Comic book convention
Comic Art Convention
Fandom
San Diego, California
Science fiction convention
WonderCon
Comic-Con Museum

References

Further reading
Bill Schelly. "The Comic-Con of Destiny". Comic-Con Souvenir Book 2019. pp. 14–32.
The "Secret Origin" of San Diego's Comic-Con International
San Diego Comic-Con – Frequently Asked Questions
Comic-Con Begins oral history

External links

1985-1989 Eisner Award winners, Comic-Con International San Diego. Archived from the original on July 3, 2013.
1991-1999 Eisner Award winners, Comic-Con International San Diego. Archived from the original on February 1, 2014
2000-2009 Eisner Award winners, Comic-Con International San Diego. Archived from the original on February 1, 2015.
2010-2020 Eisner Award winners, Comic-Con International San Diego. Archived from the original on October 30, 2020.

1970 establishments in California
Annual events in California
Comics conventions in the United States
Conventions in California
Recurring events established in 1970
Film festivals in San Diego
Multigenre conventions